Father Gets Entangled Again (Spanish:Papá se enreda otra vez) is a Mexican film. It was released on April 24, 1942, in Mexico. It stars Sara García.

References

External links
 

1940 films
1940s Spanish-language films

Mexican black-and-white films
1940s Mexican films